The Budget Enforcement Act of 1990 (BEA) (title XIII; ; codified as amended at scattered sections of 2 U.S.C. & ) was enacted by the United States Congress as title XIII of the Omnibus Budget Reconciliation Act of 1990, to enforce the deficit reduction accomplished by that law by revising the federal budget control procedures originally enacted by the Gramm–Rudman–Hollings Balanced Budget Act. The BEA created two new budget control processes: a set of caps on annually-appropriated discretionary spending, and a "pay-as-you-go" or "PAYGO" process for entitlements and taxes.

Legislative history 
The predecessor to the BEA, Gramm-Rudman-Hollings, was originally enacted in 1985 and set overall deficit targets as a way to force Congress to enact future deficit reduction. If these deficit targets were not met, the president was required issue a sequestration order to automatically reduce discretionary spending.

However, policymakers achieved these targets by using overly optimistic budget projections and other budget gimmicks, and Gramm-Rudman-Hollings was eventually viewed by policymakers as contributing to, rather than solving, the problem of rising deficits. By October 1990, the president's Office of Management and Budget projected a budget deficit for fiscal year 1991 that exceeded the statutory target; if Congress did not enact a deficit reduction plan, sequestration would have cut discretionary spending by about one-third.

In November 1990, Congress and President George H.W. Bush agreed to a bipartisan deficit reduction deal that would achieve roughly $500 billion in savings over five years through a combination of spending cuts and tax increases. These savings were enacted through the Omnibus Budget Reconciliation Act of 1990 and enforced by the budget procedures contained in Title XIII, the BEA, which was signed into law on November 5, 1990.

Provisions 
Unlike Gramm-Rudman-Hollings, which set fixed deficit targets in hopes of encouraging future Congressional action, the BEA implemented budget controls meant to prevent Congress from taking actions that would increase the deficit. Specifically, the BEA

Introduced caps on discretionary spending, thus limiting the amount of funds Congress could provide in annual appropriations bills. Members of Congress could enforce these caps while a bill was under consideration by raising a point of order. If the caps were breached through enacted legislation, they would be enforced by a presidential sequester order that would cut discretionary spending across the board.
Introduced statutory "pay-as-you-go" or PAYGO procedures to govern new legislation that impacted direct spending and/or revenues. PAYGO required that any new spending increase or tax cut be offset by spending cuts or tax increases elsewhere. The Office of Management and Budget would track such legislation throughout the fiscal year on a PAYGO scorecard, and if such spending increases and tax cuts were not completely offset, the President would issue a sequestration order that would cut non-exempt direct spending programs.
Extended and revised the deficit targets from Gramm-Rudman-Hollings, allowing for revisions to the deficit targets to reflect changes in the economy, ensuring that sequestration would not be triggered unless Congress breached the discretionary spending caps or violated PAYGO.

Subsequent legislation 
The BEA was extended by the Omnibus Reconciliation Act of 1993, and again by the Balanced Budget Act of 1997. It expired in 2002, but the Democratic Majority adopted some of its principles, known as PAYGO, or Pay-As-You-Go, in their rules during the 110th Congress. This was passed as H. RES. 6 on January 4, 2007. Statutory PAYGO was reinstated by the Statutory Pay-As-You-Go Act of 2010, which President Barack Obama signed on February 12, 2010. Discretionary spending caps, as well as deficit reduction targets, were reintroduced by the Budget Control Act of 2011.

Legacy and impact 
The BEA is credited with helping to reduce deficits during the 1990s, and regarded as more successful than its predecessor Gramm-Rudman-Hollings. Then-director of the Congressional Budget Office, Robert Reischauer, compared the legacy of these two laws in testimony before Congress in 1993, concluding that “budget procedures are much better at enforcing deficit reduction agreements (as the Budget Enforcement Act has done) than at forcing such agreements to be reached." Sequestration was triggered only twice under the BEA, resulting in small discretionary spending cuts in 1991. However, Congress began to weaken the BEA's budget controls when faced with budget surpluses in the late 1990s.

See also 

United States budget process
Congressional Budget and Impoundment Control Act of 1974
Gramm–Rudman–Hollings Balanced Budget Act
Omnibus Budget Reconciliation Act of 1990
Balanced Budget Act of 1997
Statutory Pay-As-You-Go Act of 2010
Budget Control Act of 2011

Further reading 

Omnibus Budget Reconciliation Act of 1990 Conference Report 101-961, 101st Congress, 2d Session.
Dauster, William G. Budget Process Law Annotated: 1993 Edition. Washington, D.C.: Government Printing Office, 1993. 
History of the House Budget Committee
Tax Policy Center Briefing Book, What is PAYGO?
Center on Budget and Policy Priorities, Policy Basics: Introduction to the Federal Budget Process
Center for a Responsible Federal Budget, Playing By the (Budget) Rules: Understanding and Preventing Budget Gimmicks, February 26, 2018.

References

External links
 Omnibus Budget Reconciliation Act of 1990 (PDF/details) titles VI and XIII as amended in the GPO Statute Compilations collection
 Omnibus Budget Reconciliation Act of 1990 ( details) as enacted in the US Statutes at Large
  of the 101st Congress (1989-1991) via Congress.gov

1990 in law
Government finances in the United States
1990
United States federal legislation articles without infoboxes